Hereford Sixth Form College is a co-educational state funded sixth form college in Hereford, England.

It offers over 40 subjects at A-Level and 10 at GCSE. Aylestone Business and Enterprise College (formerly Aylestone School), the former boys' and girls' grammar schools, is adjacent to the east. The college was founded in 1973 as the main provider of sixth form education in Hereford and the surrounding area and also attracts students from Abergavenny to Worcester and Brecon. The college moved into new, purpose-built facilities in 1974 which have since been extended. The School won "Sixth Form College of the Year" in the  2016 TES FE Awards.

Former principal Dr Jonathan Godfrey was appointed an OBE for services to education in the 2013 New Year's Honours list.

Activities
 Drama - the college has its theatre group; Upstage Production Company (recent productions include Prometheus Bound and Anastasia: The Musical, both in 2021.)
 Duke of Edinburgh Award group
 SRC - Student Representative Council
 Music - Academia Musica choral and instrumental programmes for the students, including regular concerts alongside the English Symphony Orchestra and international and national tours
 Sports - Rugby Academy, Football Academy as well as competitive teams in netball and hockey, and programme of sports, including badminton, basketball, five-a-side football, table tennis, trampolining and volleyball which take place during lunch times
 A purpose-built and fully staffed fitness centre (Sixth Sense Fitness)
 The Student Voice - an online newspaper written by the students
 The Rant - a political newsletter written and produced by students
 Debate Society - regular debates held by the students on topical subjects
 Earthquake Monitoring Service
 Model United Nations
 An annual mock election

Notable alumni
 Ellie Goulding, Musician
 Paul Keetch, Liberal Democrat Member of Parliament from 1997-2010 for Hereford
 Mary Rhodes, BBC Television presenter
 Emma Stansfield, Actress, played  Veronica 'Ronnie' Clayton in the soap opera, Coronation Street
 Andrew Marston, BBC Radio presenter
 Alex Price, Danny Swailes Football Academy CEO
Warwick Murray, New Zealand award-winning academic and musician
 Sean Thomas, Author and journalist
Rose Ellen Dix, Youtuber, author, and filmmaker

References

External links
 

Educational institutions established in 1973
Education in Hereford
Sixth form colleges in Herefordshire
Learning and Skills Beacons
1973 establishments in England
Buildings and structures in Hereford